Connal Joe Trueman (born 26 March 1996) is an English footballer who plays as a goalkeeper for  club Millwall. He joined Birmingham City as an 11-year-old in 2007, made his Football League debut for them in 2018, and was released in 2022 after 15 years with the club. He also spent time on loan at non-league clubs Leamington and Solihull Moors and at AFC Wimbledon, Swindon Town and Oxford United of League One.

Club career

Early life and career
Trueman was born in Birmingham and attended King Edward VI Aston School. He joined Birmingham City's academy in 2007, and took up a scholarship in July 2012. He signed his first professional contract, of one year with the option of a second, in June 2014. When first-choice goalkeeper Darren Randolph had to miss the visit to Blackburn Rovers in October 2014 through suspension and previous third-choice Nick Townsend's loan had no recall clause, Trueman was given a squad number and a place among the substitutes; he remained unused. He then spent time on loan at Leamington, for whom he played twice in the Conference North and once in the FA Trophy.

Birmingham City
At the end of the 2014–15 season, Birmingham took up their option for another year on Trueman's contract, and in April 2016, he signed a one-year contract, with the option for a further year. He made his first appearance of the season in a matchday squad on 30 April, at home to Middlesbrough, when Adam Legzdins took over in goal after Tomasz Kuszczak underwent surgery on a broken nose, and kept his place on the bench for the last match of the campaign, away to Cardiff City. In between, he was an unused substitute for the Birmingham reserve team that lost the 2016 Birmingham Senior Cup final to National League North champions Solihull Moors. On 13 September 2016, away to Reading, Kuszczak was injured during the warm-up, so Legzdins took his place in the starting eleven and Trueman was added to the substitutes. He retained his place in the matchday squad for a further four league matches while Kuszczak recovered. He signed a new three-year contract in May 2017.

When David Stockdale joined in 2018, Trueman dropped to fourth choice, and went on loan to Solihull Moors until January 2018. An injury to Stockdale in September left the club with only one fit professional goalkeeper (Legzdins was sold before the season started), so Trueman was recalled to act as backup to Kuszczak. When Stockdale returned to the starting eleven in November, manager Steve Cotterill retained Trueman in the matchday squad, but when Garry Monk took over in March, he recalled Kuszczak to the bench.

At the end of the season, Monk told both Stockdale and Kuszczak they were free to find other clubs, and neither took part in the first team's pre-season training. A bid for Ipswich Town's Bartosz Białkowski came to nothing, and Trueman went through pre-season as first-choice goalkeeper. He made his Football League debut in the starting eleven for the opening match of Birmingham's 2018–19 season, a 2–2 draw at home to Norwich City in the Championship, and despite the arrival of the experienced Lee Camp kept his place for the visit to Middlesbrough. According to the Birmingham Mail, Trueman "had no chance with a superbly struck goal but [was] all at sea on a couple of occasions", and Camp took over for the next match and the rest of the season, with Trueman as a regular on the bench. With Birmingham safe from relegation, he was due to start the final match of the season, away to Reading, but illness prevented his appearance.

Trueman signed a two-year contract extension ahead of the 2019–20 season, which he began as third choice, with Camp in the team and Stockdale on the bench. He came into the matchday squad in late October after Stockdale was injured in training, and after Camp made mistakes that cost the team points, made his first appearance of the season on 23 November away to Huddersfield Town. He performed well enough to keep his place, and held it for ten matches, but after he and the team conceded five goals to Leeds United and then three against Hull City, Camp was recalled for his ability to organise his defence and retained for the rest of the season.

Loans
On 4 August 2020, the day after Camp left Birmingham at the end of his contract, Trueman joined League One club AFC Wimbledon for the 2020–21 campaign. He was given squad number 1, and began his loan in the starting eleven for the opening match of the season, a 2–1 win at home to Charlton Athletic in the EFL Trophy. After appearing in 22 matches for the Dons, Trueman was recalled by Birmingham on 8 January 2021. Trueman was an unused substitute for Birmingham once in mid-January in the absence of regular backup goalkeeper Andrés Prieto, and on 1 March, he joined League One club Swindon Town on an emergency loan. He started four matches, all defeats, before returning to his parent club.

Having been a regular on Birmingham's bench as backup to loanee Matija Sarkic in the 2021–22 season while Etheridge recovered from COVID-19, Trueman joined League One club Oxford United on an emergency loan on 23 November 2021, and played twice. When Sarkic's loan spell was ended by a dislocated shoulder, Trueman resumed his place on the bench as backup to Etheridge. He was used once, playing the last 20 minutes of the visit to Nottingham Forest in April 2022 after Etheridge was knocked unconscious in collision with Djed Spence; he conceded shortly after coming on, as Birmingham lost 2–0, and Zach Jeacock took over the starting role for the next two matches.

After 15 years with the club, Trueman was released by Birmingham when his contract expired at the end of the 2021–22 season.

Millwall
Trueman joined Championship club Millwall on 4 August 2022 on a short-term contract running until January 2023.

Career statistics

References

1996 births
Living people
Footballers from Birmingham, West Midlands
English footballers
Association football goalkeepers
Birmingham City F.C. players
Leamington F.C. players
Solihull Moors F.C. players
AFC Wimbledon players
Swindon Town F.C. players
Oxford United F.C. players
Millwall F.C. players
National League (English football) players
English Football League players